Smart drug may refer to:

 Nootropic, a drug which purportedly improves mental functions 
 A pharmaceutical capable of discriminating between diseased and healthy cells, as in targeted therapy or targeted drug delivery